Ramsey Lake is a lake in Wright County, in the U.S. state of Minnesota.

Ramsey Lake was named for Alexander Ramsey (1815–1903), the second governor of Minnesota.

See also
List of lakes in Minnesota

References

Lakes of Minnesota
Lakes of Wright County, Minnesota